Volleyball competitions at the 2022 South American Games in Asuncion, Paraguay were held between 4 and 14 October 2022 at the Paraguayan Volleyball Federation facilities located within the SND complex cluster.

Two medal events were scheduled to be contested: a men's and women's tournament. A total of 132 athletes (60 athletes–5 teams for men and 72 athletes–6 teams for women) competed in the events. Both tournaments were open competitions without age restrictions.

Argentina and Colombia were the defending champions of the South American Games men's and women's volleyball events. Argentina had won all previous men's tournament but did not take part in this edition while Colombia had won the women's tournament in the Cochabamba 2018 edition.

Chile and Peru won the gold medal in the men's and women's events respectively.

Participating nations
A total of 6 ODESUR nations registered teams for the volleyball events. Each nation was able to enter a maximum of 24 athletes (one team of 12 players per gender). Bolivia, Chile, Colombia, hosts Paraguay and Peru participated in both men's and women's tournament. Argentina participated in the women's tournament.

Schedule
The competition schedule is as follows:

Medal summary

Medal table

Medalists

Men's tournament

Women's tournament

Preliminary round

Pool A

Pool B

Final round

Final standings

References

External links
 ASU2022 Volleyball at ASU2022 official website.
 ASU2022 Water polo Teams Male.
 ASU2022 Water polo Teams Female.

Volleyball
South American Games
2022
2022 South American Games
Volleyball at the 2022 South American Games